Pran Buri railway station is a railway station in Pran Buri Sub-district, Pran Buri District, Prachuap Khiri Khan Province. The station is a class 3 railway station,  from Bangkok railway station.

Train services 
Few trains stop at the Pran Buri station.

References 
 
 

Railway stations in Thailand